Pseudolimnophila luteipennis is a species of limoniid crane fly in the family Limoniidae.

References

Further reading

External links

 

Limoniidae